Here is a list of notable archaeology books :

The Adventure of Archaeology
Aku-Aku
Ancient Monuments of the Mississippi Valley
Ancient Ruins and Archaeology
Anglo-Saxon Deviant Burial Customs
Le Antichità di Ercolano
The Archaeology of Death and Burial
The Archaeology of Hindu Ritual
The Archaeology of Ritual and Magic
The Archaeology of Shamanism
The Bible Unearthed
The Bog People
British Archaeological Reports
The British Edda
Canada's Stonehenge
Death and Memory in Early Medieval Britain
Did God Have a Wife?
Encyclopedia of Indo-European Culture
Facts on the Ground
Fragments from Antiquity
Geological Evidences of the Antiquity of Man
Gods, Graves and Scholars
Hidden Treasures of Swat
Hydriotaphia, Urn Burial
Inside the Neolithic Mind
Lost Cities and Vanished Civilizations
The Making of the English Landscape
The Megalithic European
The Megaliths of Upper Laos
The Mind in the Cave
Miscellaneous Babylonian Inscriptions
Mission de Phénicie (1865–1874)
The Modern Antiquarian
One World Archaeology
The Pagan Middle Ages
Perfect Order
El Perú (book)
Rites of the Gods
Ritual and Domestic Life in Prehistoric Europe
Rock Art and the Prehistory of Atlantic Europe
A Short History of Progress
Signals of Belief in Early England
The Significance of Monuments
Stonehenge in its landscape
Symbols of Power
The Tribe of Witches
The Viking Way (book)
Where Troy Once Stood
Who Were the Early Israelites and Where Did They Come from?

Archaeology books
Bibliographies of history